The Hope Party is a Tunisian political party that fielded Selma Elloumi Rekik as its candidate in the 2019 Tunisian presidential election.

References

2012 establishments in Tunisia
Destourian parties
Political parties established in 2012
Political parties in Tunisia